Pseudopostega spatulata is a moth of the family Opostegidae. It is known only from the La Selva Biological Station, a lowland rainforest area in north-eastern Costa Rica.

The length of the forewings is 2–2.4 mm. Adults are mostly white. Adults have been collected in February and September.

Etymology
The species name is derived from the Latin spatha (a broad paddle) in reference to the broad, spatulate apex of the gnathal lobe in the male genitalia.

External links
A Revision of the New World Plant-Mining Moths of the Family Opostegidae (Lepidoptera: Nepticuloidea)

Opostegidae
Moths described in 2007